The 1990–91 Polska Liga Hokejowa season was the 56th season of the Polska Liga Hokejowa, the top level of ice hockey in Poland. 10 teams participated in the league, and Polonia Bytom won the championship.

First round

Final round

Qualification round

Playoffs

Quarterfinals 
 Polonia Bytom - GKS Tychy 2:0 (5:2, 11:2)
 Naprzód Janów - KS Cracovia 2:0 (6:3, 4:2)
 Unia Oświęcim - GKS Katowice 2:0 (5:3, 4:1)
 Podhale Nowy Targ - Towimor Torun 2:1 (8:2, 4:5 SO, 7:0)

Semifinals 
 Polonia Bytom - Naprzód Janów 2:0 (6:3, 6:0)
 Unia Oświęcim - Podhale Nowy Targ 2:1 (4:0, 2:4, 6:4)

Final
 Polonia Bytom - Unia Oświęcim 2:0 (5:2, 3:2)

Placing round

7th place 
 GKS Tychy - GKS Katowice 2:0 (6:4, 7:3)

5th place 
 Towimor Torun - KS Cracovia 2:0 (4:3 SO, 3:1)

3rd place 
 Podhale Nowy Targ - Naprzód Janów 2:0 (5:1, 5:3)

Relegation 
 Zagłębie Sosnowiec - ŁKS Łódź 2:1 (5:2, 2:8, 10:7)

External links
 Season on hockeyarchives.info

1990-91
Pol
Polska